The Vostok-2 ( meaning "East"), GRAU index 8A92 was an expendable carrier rocket used by the Soviet Union between 1962 and 1967. Forty five were launched, of which five failed. It was derived from the earlier Vostok-K, with uprated engines. It was a member of the Vostok family of rockets.

The Vostok-2 made its maiden flight on 1 June 1962, from Site 1/5 at the Baikonur Cosmodrome. The resulting explosion damaged the launch complex, and necessitated delays to several other launches that had been scheduled from that complex, including Vostok 3 and Vostok 4. Thirteen months later, on 10 July 1963, an almost identical failure occurred. The other three failures were caused by a second stage malfunction, a second stage guidance problem, and a problem with the first stage.

The Vostok-2 was used exclusively to launch Zenit-2 reconnaissance satellites. Launches occurred from sites 1/5 and 31/6 at Baikonur, and Site 41/1 at Plesetsk. In 1967, it was retired in favour of the Voskhod.

References 

Space launch vehicles of the Soviet Union
R-7 (rocket family)